Collector's Series is a 1985 album by singer-songwriter Dolly Parton.

Album information
This album is a compilation, and included some of Parton's chart hits, along with  lesser known album cuts originally released between 1969 and 1978. It was created for further promotion by her record label, which would soon drop her despite her success.

It did not do much for her career, as she had no promotion, being dropped from the label very soon after. However, Collectors Series was released during a time when none of Parton's classic early 1970s work had yet been issued on CD (given the fairly recent advent of the medium), and thus was the first instance signature Parton songs "Jolene", "I Will Always Love You", "Coat of Many Colors" and "The Bargain Store" appeared on CD.

Track listing
All songs written by Dolly Parton, except for "In the Ghetto" and "Heartbreaker".
 		
Side 1
"Jolene"
"I'm a Drifter"
"My Blue Ridge Mountain Boy"
"In the Ghetto"
"She Never Met A Man (She Didn't Like)"
"Coat of Many Colors"
"I Will Always Love You"
Side 2
"Two Doors Down"
"Love Is Like a Butterfly"
"Applejack"
"The Bargain Store"
"Me And Little Andy" 		
"The Seeker"		
"Heartbreaker"

References

External links
Collector's Series at Dolly Parton On-Line

1985 greatest hits albums
Dolly Parton compilation albums